Guy Achard (born 1936 in Lyon) is a French Latinist and historian of Ancient Rome. An emeritus professor at the Jean Moulin University Lyon 3, he is a specialist in Latin rhetoric and Roman sociology.

Publications 
 
 
 
 Cicéron : De l'invention, éd. traduction et commentaire, Paris, Les Belles Lettres, coll. des Universités de France, Paris, 1994; 
 La Femme à Rome, Paris, Presses universitaires de France, coll. « Que sais-je ? », 1995, 128 p.; éd. roumaine, Bucarest, Corint, 2004 
 Néron, Paris, Presses universitaires de France, coll. « Que sais-je? », 1995, 128 p.; éd. roumaine, Bucarest, Corint, 2004; éd. japonaise, Tokyo, Hakusuisha, 2016, 
 Orateur, Auditeurs, Lecteurs. À propos de l'éloquence romaine à la fin de la République et au début du Principat, éd. et direction avec Marie Ledentu, Lyon, coll. du C.E.R.O.R., 2000 117 p. 
 Tite-Live : Histoire romaine, l. XXXIII, translation and commentaries, Paris, Les Belles Lettres, coll. des Universités de France, 2001, 211 p. including 70 doubles, and 2 maps. 
 La Com' au pouvoir, Limoges, éd.Fyp. coll. Présence, 2011, 221 p. 
 Parole, media, pouvoir dans l'Occident romain. Hommages offerts au Professeur Guy Achard, collected and published by Marie Ledentu, Lyon, coll. du C.E.R.O.R. 2007, 535 p.

External links 
  La communication à Rome on persee.fr
 
 Achart Resume

Academic staff of the University of Lyon
1936 births
French Latinists
20th-century French historians
21st-century French historians
Living people